Bedollo (Bedól in local dialect) is a comune (municipality) in Trentino in the northern Italian region Trentino-Alto Adige/Südtirol, located about  northeast of Trento.

The municipality of Bedollo contains the frazioni (subdivisions, mainly villages and hamlets) Centrale, Piazze, Brusago, and Regnana.

Bedollo borders the following municipalities: Sover, Segonzano, Lona-Lases, Baselga di Pinè, Palù del Fersina, and Sant'Orsola Terme.

Demographic evolution

References

Cities and towns in Trentino-Alto Adige/Südtirol